The Alliance of Women Film Journalists (AWFJ) is a non-profit organization founded in 2006. It is based in New York City and is dedicated to supporting work by and about women in the film industry. The AWFJ is composed of 84 professional female movie critics, journalists, and feature writers working in print, broadcast, and online media. The British Film Institute describes the AWFJ as an organization that collects articles by its (mainly U.S.-based) members, gives annual awards, and "supports films by and about women".

EDA Awards

Beginning in 2007, the group annually gives awards to the best (and worst) in film, as voted on by its members. These awards are called EDAs in honor of AWFJ founder Jennifer Merin's mother, actress Eda Reiss Merin. EDA is also an acronym for Excellent Dynamic Activism. These awards have been reported on in recent years by a number of mainstream media sources including Time, USA Today, and Variety, and are also included in The New York Times movie reviews awards lists. In 2007, AWFJ released a Top 100 Films List in response to the American Film Institute revision of their 100 Years, 100 Films list. The AWFJ created their list to see if their members would come up with a substantially different list from AFI.

In addition to awards for achievement granted regardless of gender (Best Film, Best Director, Best Original Screenplay, Best Screenplay Adapted, Best Documentary, Best Animated Film, Best Ensemble Cast, Best Editing, Best Cinematography, Best Film Music or Score, and Best Non-English-Language Film), there are also "EDA Female Focus Awards" (Best Woman Director, Best Woman Screenwriter, Kick Ass Award For Best Female Action Star, Best Animated Female, Best Breakthrough Performance, Best Newcomer, Women's Image Award, Hanging in There Award for Persistence, Actress Defying Age and Agism, Lifetime Achievement Award, Award for Humanitarian Activism, Female Icon Award, and This Year's Outstanding Achievement by a Woman in the Film Industry) and "EDA Special Mention Awards" (Hall of Shame Award, Actress Most in Need of a New Agent, Movie You Wanted to Love But Just Couldn't, Unforgettable Moment Award, Best Depiction of Nudity, Sexuality, or Seduction, Most Egregious Age Difference Between Leading Man and Love Interest, Bravest Performance Award, Best Leap from Actress to Director Award, Cultural Crossover Award, Sequel or Remake That Shouldn't Have Been Made Award, and Best of the Fests).

EDA Best of Awards winners and nominees

EDA Female Focus Awards winners and nominees

EDA Special Mention Awards

Notes

References

External links
 

 
American film critics associations
2006 establishments in New York City
Organizations established in 2006
Women's film organizations
Women's organizations based in the United States